Harrie Schoenmakers (18 January 1916 – 18 January 1999) was a Dutch racing cyclist. He rode in the 1951 Tour de France.

References

External links
 

1916 births
1999 deaths
Dutch male cyclists
Place of birth missing